The 1984–85 Quebec Nordiques season was the Nordiques sixth season in the National Hockey League.

Offseason
The Nordiques had a pretty quiet off-season, as they looked to build off of their successful 1983–84 season.  The club hired the recently retired Guy Lapointe as an assistant coach, while they also signed goaltender Richard Sevigny as a free agent from the Montreal Canadiens.  Sevigny had a 16-18-2 record with a 3.38 GAA with Montreal in 1983–84.

Regular season
Quebec started the season off pretty slow, going only 3-6-1 in their first ten games, sitting in last place in the Adams Division.  Quebec continued to play mediocre hockey for the majority of the first half of the season, as they had a 16-16-6 record after 38 games, battling with the Boston Bruins for third place in the division.  The Nordiques played much better in the second half of the season, as they would battle with the Montreal Canadiens and Buffalo Sabres for first in the division.  Quebec finished the season with a 41-30-9 record, earning 91 points, and a second-place finish, just three points behind the Canadiens.

Peter Stastny led the Nordiques offensively, leading the club with 100 points in 75 games, while Michel Goulet scored a team high 55 goals, while earning 95 points in 69 games.  Anton Stastny had 38 goals and 80 points, while Dale Hunter scored 20 goals and 72 points, while accumulating a team high 209 penalty minutes.  Brad Maxwell and Brent Ashton, acquired from the Minnesota North Stars in December, sparked the Nordiques, as Ashton had 51 points in 49 games, while Maxwell had 31 points in 50 games on the blueline.

In goal, Quebec was led by rookie Mario Gosselin, as he had a team high 19 wins with a team best 3.34 GAA in 35 games.  Richard Sevigny had a 10-6-2 record with a 3.37 GAA in 20 games, while Dan Bouchard was 12-13-4 with a 3.49 GAA in 29 games.

Final standings

Schedule and results

Playoffs
The Nordiques opened the 1985 Stanley Cup playoffs with a best of five Adams Division semi-final series against the Buffalo Sabres.  The Sabres finished the season in third place in the Adams Division with a 38–28–14 record, earning 90 points, one less than Quebec. The series began with two games at Le Colisée, and the Nordiques took care of business at home, winning the first game 5–2, followed by a close 3–2 victory in the second game to go up 2–0 in the series. The series moved to the Buffalo Memorial Auditorium for the third game, and the Sabres stayed alive in the series with a 6–4 win to cut the Nordiques series lead to 2–1. Buffalo easily handled the Nordiques in the fourth game at the Auditorium, winning 7–4, to even the series up at two games each, sending the series back to Quebec City for a deciding game 5. The Nordiques and Sabres played a very close game, with Quebec winning 6–5, to win the series and advance to the Division finals.

Quebec then faced the Montreal Canadiens in the best-of-seven Adams Division Final. The Canadiens had a 41–27–12 record during the regular season, earning 94 points and finishing in first place in the Adams Division, three points ahead of the Nordiques. Montreal eliminated their rival, the Boston Bruins in five games in the first round of the playoffs. The series opened with two games at the Montreal Forum, however, it was Quebec who struck first, winning the first game 2–1 in overtime, before the Canadiens evened the series with a 6–4 in Game 2. The series moved to Le Colisée for the next two games, and the Nordiques once again took the series lead, winning the third game 7–6 in overtime to go up 2–1 in the series. The Canadiens responded in the fourth game, defeating Quebec 3–1 in game 4 to even the series up once again. In game 5 in Montreal, the Nordiques came out flying, easily defeating the Canadiens 5–1 to take a 3–2 series lead, have a chance to clinch it at home, and game six moving back to Quebec City. In game 6, the Canadiens fought off elimination, defeating the Nordiques 5–2 to once again tie the series, forcing a seventh and deciding game at the Montreal Forum. In a very close game, the Nordiques and Canadiens were tied 2–2 after regulation time, forcing overtime, and in the extra period, Peter Šťastný scored the series clinching goal as Quebec stunned the Canadiens with a 3–2 victory, advancing to the Wales Conference finals for the second time in four seasons.

The Nordiques faced off against the Philadelphia Flyers in the best of seven Conference finals. The Flyers had the best record in the NHL, as they had a 53–20–7 record, earning 113 points, winning the Patrick Division by twelve points over the second place Washington Capitals. In the playoffs, Philadelphia swept the New York Rangers in three games, before defeating the New York Islanders in five games in the division finals. Since the Adams Division had a better head-to-head record against the Patrick Division, the Nordiques got home-ice advantage. The series began with two games at Le Colisée, as the Nordiques won a tough defensive battle in overtime by a score of 2-1 to take an early series lead.  The Flyers evened the series with a 4-2 win in the second game.  The series moved over to the Spectrum in Philadelphia, and the Flyers took a 2-1 series lead with another 4-2 victory in the third game.  The Nordiques rebounded in the fourth game at the Spectrum, silencing the Flyers with a 5-3 win to even the series up at two wins each.  The fifth game was played back in Quebec City, and the defensively tight Flyers squeaked out a 2-1 victory in the fifth game to return home with a 3-2 series lead.  Philadelphia dominated the Nordiques in the sixth game, outshooting Quebec 36-15, en route to a 3-0 victory to win the series and advance to the 1985 Stanley Cup Finals.

Quebec Nordiques 3, Buffalo Sabres 2

Quebec Nordiques 4, Montreal Canadiens 3

Philadelphia Flyers 4, Quebec Nordiques 2

Player statistics

Transactions
The Nordiques were involved in the following transactions during the 1984–85 season.

Trades

Waivers

Free agents

Draft picks
Quebec's draft picks from the 1984 NHL Entry Draft which was held at the Montreal Forum in Montreal, Quebec.

Farm teams
 Fredericton Express (AHL)

See also
1984–85 NHL season

References

External links
 

Quebec Nordiques season, 1984-85
Quebec Nordiques seasons
Que